The Brecker Bros. is the first album by the American jazz fusion group, the Brecker Brothers. It was released by Arista Records in 1975.

Reception

AllMusic awarded the album 4.5 stars and its review by Michael G. Nastos states, "First date for brothers from 1975. Side one is solid jazz/funk/fusion". At the 1976 Grammy Awards the album received three nominations, for Best R&B Instrumental Performance ("Sneakin’ up Behind You"), Best New Artist and Best Instrumental Arrangement (Randy Brecker for "Some Skunk Funk").

Track listing
All compositions by Randy Brecker except where noted.

 "Some Skunk Funk" - 5:51
 "Sponge" - 4:05
 "A Creature of Many Faces" - 7:40
 "Twilight" - 5:43
 "Sneakin’ up Behind You" (Michael Brecker, Randy Brecker, Don Grolnick, Will Lee, David Sanborn) - 4:54
 "Rocks" - 4:39
 "Levitate" - 4:31
 "Oh My Stars" - 3:13
 "D.B.B." - 4:46

Personnel 

The Brecker Brothers
 Michael Brecker – tenor saxophone
 Randy Brecker – trumpet, flugelhorn, vocals (8)

Other Musicians
 David Sanborn – alto saxophone
 Don Grolnick – keyboards
 Bob Mann – guitars
 Will Lee – electric bass, vocals (5)
 Harvey Mason – drums
 Chris Parker – additional drums (5) 
 Ralph MacDonald – percussion

Production
 Steve Backer – executive producer 
 Randy Brecker – producer 
 Gerald Block – engineer, remixing 
 David Stone – remix assistant 
 Leanne Ungar – remix assistant 
 Bob Heimall – art direction 
 Arron Associates – design
 John Paul Endress – photography

Charts

References

1975 debut albums
Brecker Brothers albums
Arista Records albums